Jonathan Powell may refer to:
 Jonathan Powell (musician) (born 1969), British musician
 Jonathan Powell (producer) (born 1947), British television producer and executive
 Jonathan Powell (Labour adviser) (born 1956), Chief of Staff to former British Prime Minister Tony Blair
 Jonathan Powell (cricketer) (born 1979), former English cricketer
 Jonathan Powell (classicist), British Professor of Latin